Durian is a surname.  It can refer to:

 Douglas Durian, US professor of physics and astronomy at the University of Pennsylvania
 , researcher
  (b. 1975), Brazilian singer
 Ohan Durian (1922-2011), Armenian conductor and composer
  (b. 1943), German art historian
  (b. 1946), German author
  (1892-1969), German author

See also
Duran (surname)

Durian
Durian